Mount Coolon is a rural town and locality in the Whitsunday Region, Queensland, Australia.

Geography 
The Suttor River rises here.  The river marks part of the eastern and all of the southern and western boundaries of Mount Coolon.  The Sellheim River forms a small section of the northern border.  The landscape is dotted with many waterholes and numerous peaks belonging to the Leichhardt Range.

Mount Coolon has the following mountains:

 Beaucazon Peak 
 Bulgonunna Peak 
 Bungobine Peak 
 Carey Guille 
 Mount Carmel 
 Mount Douglas 
 Mount Harry Marsh 
 Mount Kroman 
 Mount Loudon 
 Mount Manaman 
 Mount Patterson 
 Mount Tindale 
 Norcot Peak 
 Rodborough Hill 
 Scartwater Hill 
 The Tor 
 Whitestone Peak

History 

Mount Coolon was originally called Koala, and was founded on Yangga tribal lands. It was renamed after Thomas Coolon, a prospector. 

In 1918, following a claims dispute, Coolon shot and killed four men, then committed suicide.

Koala Provisional School opened on 11 July 1921. On 1 September 1925, it became Koala State School. In 1946, it was renamed Mount Coolon State School in 1946. It closed in 1950, but reopened in 1962. It finallly closed on 30 April 1971.

Mount Coolon Post Office opened on 1 May 1925 (a receiving office had been open from 1922) and closed in 1984.

Koala police station opened in 1925 and was renamed Mount Coolon police station in 1931. It closed in 1967. 18 police officers served at the station over its lifetime.

Between 1925 and 1967 when the station closed there were 18 officers stationed at Mt Coolon. 

Heritage listings 

Mount Coolon has a number of heritage-listed sites, including:
 Collinsville road: Barclay's Battery
 St Annes Road: Suttor River Causeway on the Old Bowen Downs Road

Education 
There are no schools in Mount Coolon. Glenden State School in Glenden to the east is the nearest government primary and secondary school; however, the distances involved in a daily commute mean that distance education and boarding schools are other options.

Amenities 
Mount Coolon Hotel is at 1 Mill Street. It provides meals and accommodation.

The former Mount Coolon State School is now the Mount Coolon Community Centre.

References

External links

 

Towns in Queensland
Whitsunday Region
Localities in Queensland